Tignes-les-Brevières (1550m) is a small skiing village in the French Alps that is the lowest point of the ski resort of Tignes.

Owing to its geographical location the village receives as much snowfall as its neighbours and during the 2005/6 season, Les Brevieres had over 4 metres of snow. The town is connected to other parts of Tignes after ski runs shut by a continuously operating gondola.

Overview
Les Brevieres is a traditional village and is much more picturesque than the other villages that make up the resort of Tignes. It has grown in size in recent years and now offers many more facilities whilst still retaining its charm.  It is also considerably cheaper to stay in than either Val d'Isère or Tignes.

The skiing area between Tignes and Val d'Isère is marketed as L'Espace Killy, after the 1968 (Winter) Olympic gold medalist, Jean-Claude Killy.

Tignes offers 39 ski lifts: 1 funiculaire, 1 cable car, 3 gondola lifts, 21 chairlifts, 13 drag lifts – an area of 150 km2 of ski runs – 80 ski trails: 6 green, 38 blue, 20 red, 16 black – a maximum vertical distance of 1900 metres from the Grande Motte (3450 metres) to Les Brévières (1550 metres).

The ski season is very long in Espace Killy with the lifts opening around December 1 and closing after the May Bank Holiday around May 6–8. Skiing down to Brevieres is usually very good late season due to the extensive use of snow cannons on the runs to the village.

There is a nursery slope with a free drag lift.

Connections to the rest of the Espace Killy are fast via a gondola then a chair.  It takes about 20 minutes on the lifts, followed by one piste into Tignes Le Lac.  Alternative routes are available, either 3 chairs up and the same piste down, or one chair to Tignes les Boisses followed by a free bus up to Tignes.  Returning to Tignes les Brevieres requires just one chair lift (Chaudannes) which takes 6 minutes from Tignes le Lac.

Village facilities include:
 3 ski shops
 ESF ski school
small supermarket
 tabac
 cash point
 9 bars & restaurants

Accommodation:
 in recent years new development has substantially increased the pool of chalet and apartment accommodation

References

Tourist attractions in Savoie
Ski areas and resorts in France